The 2020 Caen municipal election took place on 15 March 2020 in conjunction with the first round of the 2020 French municipal elections throughout the country.

Electoral history

2014 Caen municipal election results

Election results in Caen since 2014

Declared candidates

Lutte Ouvrière 
The Worker's Struggle party list was led by Pierre Casevitz in Caen.

La France Insoumise 
The La France Insoumise party list was led by Philippe Velten.

Socialist Party, Génération.s & GRS 
The Socialist Party list was led by Gilles Déterville.

Caen en commun 
The Far-left list Caen en commun was led by Aurélien Guidi.

Europe Ecology - The Greens, Citoyens à Caen, Community Party & Cap21 
The Europe Ecology – The Greens party list was led by Rudy L'Orphelin.

The Republicans 
On 28 August 2018, incumbent Mayor Joël Bruneau announced that he was running for re-election as a member of The Republicans. His list was supported in 2020 by La République En Marche, the Union of Democrats and Independents and the Democratic Movement.

National Rally 
The National Rally list in Caen was led by Isabelle Gilbert.

Election results

References 

Municipal elections in Caen
2020 municipal elections in France